San Martín del Valledor is a parish (administrative division) in Allande, a municipality within the province and autonomous community of Asturias, in northern Spain.

The postal code is 33887.

Villages and hamlets
 Aguanes
 Busvidal
 Coba
 Cornollo (Cornolyo)
 El Engertal (El Enxertal)
 La Furada (A Furada)
 Paradas
 El Provo
 Robledo (Robredo)
 Rubieiro
 Salcedo
 Tremado (Tremao)
 Villasonte (Vilasonte)
 San Martín del Valledor (Samartín)

References

External links
 Allande 

Parishes in Allande